Jeff Powell may refer to:

 Jeff Powell (American football) (born 1963), American football player 
 Jeff Powell (rower) (born 1976), Canadian rower